Finn Bjørnseth (5 February 1892 – 5 May 1970) was a Norwegian geodesist and military officer.

Personal life
Bjørnseth was born in Kristiania (now Oslo), a son of colonel Johan Hagbarth Bjørnseth and Fanny Augusta Larsen. In 1920 he married Mathilde Michelsen.

Career
Bjørnseth graduated from the Norwegian Military College in 1915. He graduated in astronomy from the University of Oslo in 1923, and further studied geodesy and related subjects in France and Switzerland from 1927 to 1928. He worked as geodesist for the Norwegian Mapping and Cadastre Authority from 1918 to 1939. From 1939 to 1959 he assumed administrative positions in the municipalities of Aker and Oslo, from 1952 as head of surveying in Oslo.

Bjørnseth engaged in organizational work. He chaired Norsk kartografisk forening, was a member of Norges geografiske komite, and chaired Standards Norway's committee for map symbolization.

References

1892 births
1970 deaths
Scientists from Oslo
Norwegian geodesists
Norwegian Army personnel
Norwegian Military College alumni
University of Oslo alumni